Skredshol was a noble-seat farm (setegård) in Norway. It is a large farm located in the former Nes municipality in Innlandet county. It lies on a peninsula extending into Mjøsa, Norway's largest lake. The farm's main building is protected as a historically significant residence. It had a total area of 202.6 hectares in 1998. 

Historically, as a setegård, it was exempt from taxes and tithe. It is initially mentioned in records in 1403. The farm was owned by Norway’s Reich Chancellor Jens Bjelke and subsequently by his son, Jørgen Bjelke. In 1682, Skredshol was sold by Jørgen Bjelke (then Deputy Governor General of Norway, a Lieutenant General in the Norwegian Army, and sheriff for Bratsberg) to his brother-in-law, Hans von Løwenhielm. Two years later Caspar Christopher Brockenhuus became the owner. Since Brockenhuus was married to the daughter of Løwenhielm he received Skredshol farm and Hovinsholm farm as gifts from his father-in-law. Brockenhuus, who was colonel in the Oppland Infantry Regiment, had previously purchased Tjerne farm from Jørgen Bjelke; so from the 1680s Brockenhuus owned these three major Hedmark farms. 

From 1922 it has been in ownership of the Moslets family.

References
 

Buildings and structures in Innlandet
Culture in Innlandet